Luxembourg competed at the 1964 Summer Olympics in Tokyo, Japan. 12 competitors, 10 men and 2 women, took part in 18 events in 7 sports.

Athletics

Cycling

Two cyclists represented Luxembourg in 1964.

Individual road race

 Johny Schleck — 4:39:51.74 (→ 19th place)
 Edy Schütz — 4:39:51.79 (→ 76th place)

Fencing

Two fencers, both women, represented Luxembourg in 1964.

Women's foil
 Ginette Rossini
 Colette Flesch

Gymnastics

Shooting

One shooter represented Luxembourg in 1964.

50 m rifle, three positions
 Victor Kremer

50 m rifle, prone
 Victor Kremer

Swimming

Wrestling

References

External links
Official Olympic Reports

Nations at the 1964 Summer Olympics
1964
1964 in Luxembourgian sport